Borek may refer to:

Food 

 Börek, a family of pastries or pies made in the Middle East and the Balkans

Places

Czech Republic
Borek (České Budějovice District), a municipality and village in the South Bohemian Region
Borek (Havlíčkův Brod District), a municipality and village in the Vysočina Region
Borek (Jičín District), a municipality and village in the Hradec Králové Region
Borek (Pardubice District), a municipality and village in the Pardubice Region
Borek (Prague-East District), a municipality and village in the Central Bohemian Region
Borek (Rokycany), a village and administrative part of Rokycany in the Plzeň Region
Štěnovický Borek, a municipality and village in the Plzeň Region
Velký Borek, a municipality and village in the Central Bohemian Region

Poland
Borek, Głogów County in Lower Silesian Voivodeship (south-west Poland)
Borek, Trzebnica County in Lower Silesian Voivodeship (south-west Poland)
Borek, Gmina Kamionka in Lublin Voivodeship (east Poland)
Borek, Golub-Dobrzyń County in Kuyavian-Pomeranian Voivodeship (north-central Poland)
Borek, Radziejów County in Kuyavian-Pomeranian Voivodeship (north-central Poland)
Borek, Toruń County in Kuyavian-Pomeranian Voivodeship (north-central Poland)
Borek, Hajnówka County in Podlaskie Voivodeship (north-east Poland)
Borek, Sokółka County in Podlaskie Voivodeship (north-east Poland)
Borek, Łęczyca County in Łódź Voivodeship (central Poland)
Borek, Poddębice County in Łódź Voivodeship (central Poland)
Borek, Lesser Poland Voivodeship (south Poland)
Borek, Świętokrzyskie Voivodeship (south-central Poland)
Borek, Kozienice County in Masovian Voivodeship (east-central Poland)
Borek, Ostrołęka County in Masovian Voivodeship (east-central Poland)
Borek, Grodzisk Wielkopolski County in Greater Poland Voivodeship (west-central Poland)
Borek, Gmina Godziesze Wielkie in Greater Poland Voivodeship (west-central Poland)
Borek, Gmina Szczytniki in Greater Poland Voivodeship (west-central Poland)
Borek, Kępno County in Greater Poland Voivodeship (west-central Poland)
Borek, Rawicz County in Greater Poland Voivodeship (west-central Poland)
Borek, Szamotuły County in Greater Poland Voivodeship (west-central Poland)
Borek, Wolsztyn County in Greater Poland Voivodeship (west-central Poland)
Borek, Częstochowa County in Silesian Voivodeship (south Poland)
Borek, Gorzów County in Lubusz Voivodeship (west Poland)
Borek, Zielona Góra County in Lubusz Voivodeship (west Poland)
Borek, Brzeg County in Opole Voivodeship (south-west Poland)
Borek, Kluczbork County in Opole Voivodeship (south-west Poland)
Borek, Krapkowice County in Opole Voivodeship (south-west Poland)
Borek, Namysłów County in Opole Voivodeship (south-west Poland)
Borek, Nysa County in Opole Voivodeship (south-west Poland)
Borek, Olesno County in Opole Voivodeship (south-west Poland)
Borek, Opole County in Opole Voivodeship (south-west Poland)
Borek, Pomeranian Voivodeship (north Poland)
Borek, Gołdap County in Warmian-Masurian Voivodeship (north Poland)
Borek, Iława County in Warmian-Masurian Voivodeship (north Poland)
Borek, Pisz County in Warmian-Masurian Voivodeship (north Poland)

People
 Borek, a Slavic masculine given name, cognate to Lubomir
 Bořek Dočkal, Czech football player
 Borek Sedlák, Czech ski jumper
 Bořek Šípek, Czech architect and designer
 Borek Zakouřil, Czech alpine skier
 Borek, a surname
 Ernest Borek, Hungarian-American microbiologist
 Tomáš Borek, Czech football player
 Scott Borek, American ice hockey player and coach

Other uses
 Kenn Borek Air, a Canadian airline

See also
 Borik, an urban neighborhood in the city of Banja Luka, Bosnia and Herzegovina